Steve Ray Hamer (born November 13, 1973) is an American retired professional basketball player. He had a brief National Basketball Association career.

Playing career
The 7-foot center played at the University of Tennessee. He was the #38 pick in the second round of the 1996 NBA Draft by the Boston Celtics and appeared in 35 games (starting three) during the 1996–97 NBA season for the 15–67 Boston Celtics.

References

External links
https://sites.google.com/site/stevehamerbasketball/

1973 births
Living people
Basketball players from Memphis, Tennessee
Boston Celtics draft picks
Boston Celtics players
Centers (basketball)
Tennessee Volunteers basketball players
American men's basketball players